Chavannes is a commune in the Cher department in the Centre-Val de Loire region of France.

Geography
The A71 autoroute passes through the eastern part of the commune’s territory

Population

Sights
 The church of St. Anne, dating from the twelfth century.
 A sixteenth-century manorhouse.
 Traces of a feudal castle.

See also
Communes of the Cher department

References

Communes of Cher (department)